DDA may refer to:

Dda (DNA-dependent ATPase), a DNA helicase
Delhi Development Authority, the planning agency for Delhi, India
Demand deposit account, a deposit account held at a bank or other financial institution
Demand-driven acquisition, a model of library collection development
Digital differential analyzer, a digital implementation of a differential analyzer
Digital differential analyzer (graphics algorithm), a method of drawing lines on a computer screen
Disability Discrimination Act 1992, Australian legislation
Disability Discrimination Act 1995, UK legislation 
Discontinuous Deformation Analysis, an analysis procedure used in physics and engineering
Discrete dipole approximation, method for computing scattering of radiation by particles of arbitrary shape
Division on Dynamical Astronomy, a branch of the American Astronomical Society
Doha Development Agenda of the World Trade Organization
Dual Dynamic Acceleration, an Intel technology for increasing single-threaded performance on multi-core processors
Dutch Dakota Association, a Dutch organisation dedicated to preserving and operating classic aircraft
Dynamic difficulty adjustment or dynamic game difficulty balancing, a method of automatically adjusting video game difficulty based on player ability